This list of birds of Wisconsin includes species documented in the U.S. state of Wisconsin and accepted by the Records Committee of the Wisconsin Society for Ornithology (WSORC). As of July 2022 there were 441 species and a species pair included in the official list. Of them, 92 are classed as accidental, 34 are classed as casual, 53 are classed as rare, eight have been introduced to North America, and two are known to be extinct and another is thought to be. An additional 12 species are classed as hypothetical.

This list is presented in the taxonomic sequence of the Check-list of North and Middle American Birds, 7th edition through the 62nd Supplement, published by the American Ornithological Society (AOS). Common and scientific names are also those of the Check-list, except that the common names of families are from the Clements taxonomy because the AOS list does not include them.

Unless otherwise noted, all species listed below are considered to occur regularly in Wisconsin as permanent residents, summer or winter visitors, or migrants. These tags are used to annotate some species:

(A) Accidental - species with fewer than one record every five years per the WSO
(C) Casual - species with at least one record every one to five years per the WSO
(R) Rare - species found annually but with fewer than eight records per year according to the WSO
(I) Introduced - species established in North America solely as result of direct or indirect human action
(E) Extinct - recent species which no longer exist
(H) Hypothetical - species which have been reported but not confirmed

Ducks, geese, and waterfowl

Order: AnseriformesFamily: Anatidae

The family Anatidae includes the ducks and most duck-like waterfowl, such as geese and swans. These birds are adapted to an aquatic existence with webbed feet, bills which are flattened to a greater or lesser extent, and feathers that are excellent at shedding water due to special oils. Forty-five species have been recorded in Wisconsin.

Black-bellied whistling-duck, Dendrocygna autumnalis (C)
Fulvous whistling-duck, Dendrocygna bicolor (A)
Snow goose, Anser caerulescens
Ross's goose, Anser rossii
Greater white-fronted goose, Anser albifrons
Brant, Branta bernicla (A)
Cackling goose, Branta hutchinsii
Canada goose, Branta canadensis
Mute swan, Cygnus olor (I)
Trumpeter swan, Cygnus buccinator
Tundra swan, Cygnus columbianus
Wood duck, Aix sponsa
Garganey, Spatula querquedula (A)
Blue-winged teal, Spatula discors
Cinnamon teal, Spatula cyanoptera (C)
Northern shoveler, Spatula clypeata
Gadwall, Mareca strepera
Eurasian wigeon, Mareca penelope (C)
American wigeon, Mareca americana
Mallard, Anas platyrhynchos
American black duck, Anas rubripes
Northern pintail, Anas acuta
Green-winged teal, Anas crecca
Canvasback, Aythya valisineria
Redhead, Aythya americana
Ring-necked duck, Aythya collaris
Tufted duck, Aythya fuligula (A)
Greater scaup, Aythya marila
Lesser scaup, Aythya affinis
King eider, Somateria spectabilis (C)
Common eider, Somateria mollissima (A)
Harlequin duck, Histrionicus histrionicus (R)
Surf scoter, Melanitta perspicillata
White-winged scoter, Melanitta deglandi
Black scoter, Melanitta americana
Long-tailed duck, Clangula hyemalis
Bufflehead, Bucephala albeola
Common goldeneye, Bucephala clangula
Barrow's goldeneye, Bucephala islandica (C)
Smew, Mergellus albellus (A)
Hooded merganser, Lophodytes cucullatus
Common merganser, Mergus merganser
Red-breasted merganser, Mergus serrator
Masked duck, Nomonyx dominicus (A)
Ruddy duck, Oxyura jamaicensis

New World quail
Order: GalliformesFamily: Odontophoridae

The New World quails are small, plump terrestrial birds only distantly related to the quails of the Old World, but named for their similar appearance and habits. One species has been recorded in Wisconsin.

Northern bobwhite, Colinus virginianus (R)

Pheasants, grouse, and allies
Order: GalliformesFamily: Phasianidae

Phasianidae consists of the pheasants and their allies. These are terrestrial species, variable in size but generally plump with broad relatively short wings. Many species are gamebirds or have been domesticated as a food source for humans. Eight species have been recorded in Wisconsin.

Wild turkey, Meleagris gallopavo
Ruffed grouse, Bonasa umbellus
Spruce grouse, Canachites canadensis (R)
Willow ptarmigan, Lagopus lagopus (A)
Sharp-tailed grouse, Tympanuchus phasianellus (R)
Greater prairie-chicken, Tympanuchus cupido
Gray partridge, Perdix perdix (I) (R)
Ring-necked pheasant, Phasianus colchicus (I)

Grebes
Order: PodicipediformesFamily: Podicipedidae

Grebes are small to medium-large freshwater diving birds. They have lobed toes and are excellent swimmers and divers. However, they have their feet placed far back on the body, making them quite ungainly on land. Five confirmed and one hypothetical species have been recorded in Wisconsin.

Pied-billed grebe, Podilymbus podiceps
Horned grebe, Podiceps auritus
Red-necked grebe, Podiceps grisegena (R)
Eared grebe, Podiceps nigricollis (R)
Western grebe, Aechmorphorus occidentalis (R)
Clark's grebe, Aechmophorus clarkii (H)

Pigeons and doves
Order: ColumbiformesFamily: Columbidae

Pigeons and doves are stout-bodied birds with short necks and short slender bills with a fleshy cere. Eight species have been recorded in Wisconsin.

Rock pigeon, Columba livia (I)
Band-tailed pigeon, Patagioenas fasciata (A)
Eurasian collared-dove, Streptopelia decaocto (I)
Passenger pigeon, Ectopistes migratorius (E)
Inca dove Columbina inca (A)
Common ground dove, Columbina passerina (A)
White-winged dove, Zenaida asiatica (C)
Mourning dove, Zenaida macroura

Cuckoos
Order: CuculiformesFamily: Cuculidae

The family Cuculidae includes cuckoos, roadrunners, and anis. These birds are of variable size with slender bodies, long tails, and strong legs. Three species have been recorded in Wisconsin.

Groove-billed ani, Crotophaga sulcirostris (A)
Yellow-billed cuckoo, Coccyzus americanus
Black-billed cuckoo, Coccyzus erythropthalmus

Nightjars and allies

Order: CaprimulgiformesFamily: Caprimulgidae

Nightjars are medium-sized nocturnal birds that usually nest on the ground. They have long wings, short legs, and very short bills. Most have small feet, of little use for walking, and long pointed wings. Their soft plumage is cryptically colored to resemble bark or leaves. Three species have been recorded in Wisconsin.

Common nighthawk,  Chordeiles minor
Chuck-will's-widow,  Antrostmus carolinensis (R)
Eastern whip-poor-will,  Antrostomus vociferus

Swifts
Order: ApodiformesFamily: Apodidae

The swifts are small birds which spend the majority of their lives flying. These birds have very short legs and never settle voluntarily on the ground, perching instead only on vertical surfaces. Many swifts have very long, swept-back wings which resemble a crescent or boomerang. One species has been recorded in Wisconsin.

Chimney swift, Chaetura pelagica

Hummingbirds
Order: ApodiformesFamily: Trochilidae

Hummingbirds are small birds capable of hovering in mid-air due to the rapid flapping of their wings. They are the only birds that can fly backwards. Eight species have been recorded in Wisconsin.

Mexican violetear, Colibri thalassinus (A)
Green-breasted mango, Anthracothorax prevostii (A)
Ruby-throated hummingbird, Archilochus colubris
Anna's hummingbird, Calypte anna (C)
Allen's hummingbird, Selasphorus sasin (R)
Rufous hummingbird, Selasphorus rufus (R)
Broad-billed hummingbird, Cynanthus latirostris (A)
Buff-bellied hummingbird, Amazilia yucatanensis (A)

Rails, gallinules, and coots

Order: GruiformesFamily: Rallidae

Rallidae is a large family of small to medium-sized birds which includes the rails, crakes, coots, and gallinules. The most typical family members occupy dense vegetation in damp environments near lakes, swamps, or rivers. In general they are shy and secretive birds, making them difficult to observe. Most species have strong legs and long toes which are well adapted to soft uneven surfaces. They tend to have short, rounded wings and tend to be weak fliers. Eight species have been recorded in Wisconsin.

King rail, Rallus elegans (R)
Virginia rail, Rallus limicola
Sora, Porzana carolina
Common gallinule, Gallinula galeata
American coot, Fulica americana
Purple gallinule, Porphyrio martinicus (A)
Yellow rail, Coturnicops noveboracensis (R)
Black rail, Laterallus jamaicensis (A)

Cranes
Order: GruiformesFamily: Gruidae

Cranes are large, long-legged, and long-necked birds. Unlike the similar-looking but unrelated herons, cranes fly with necks outstretched, not pulled back. Most have elaborate and noisy courting displays or "dances". Two species have been recorded in Wisconsin.

Sandhill crane, Antigone canadensis
Whooping crane, Grus americana (R)

Stilts and avocets
Order: CharadriiformesFamily: Recurvirostridae

Recurvirostridae is a family of large wading birds which includes the avocets and stilts. The avocets have long legs and long up-curved bills. The stilts have extremely long legs and long, thin, straight bills. Two species have been recorded in Wisconsin.

Black-necked stilt, Himantopus mexicanus (R)
American avocet, Recurvirostra americana

Plovers and lapwings

Order: CharadriiformesFamily: Charadriidae

The family Charadriidae includes the plovers, dotterels, and lapwings. They are small to medium-sized birds with compact bodies, short thick necks, and long, usually pointed, wings. They are found in open country worldwide, mostly in habitats near water. Seven species have been recorded in Wisconsin.

Black-bellied plover, Pluvialis squatarola
American golden-plover, Pluvialis dominica
Killdeer, Charadrius vociferus
Semipalmated plover, Charadrius semipalmatus
Piping plover, Charadrius melodus (R)
Wilson's plover, Charadrius wilsonia (A)
Snowy plover, Charadrius nivosus (A)

Sandpipers and allies

Order: CharadriiformesFamily: Scolopacidae

Scolopacidae is a large diverse family of small to medium-sized shorebirds including the sandpipers, curlews, godwits, shanks, tattlers, woodcocks, snipes, dowitchers, and phalaropes. The majority of these species eat small invertebrates picked out of the mud or soil. Different lengths of legs and bills enable multiple species to feed in the same habitat, particularly on the coast, without direct competition for food. Thirty-five confirmed and one hypothetical species have been recorded in Wisconsin.

Upland sandpiper, Bartramia longicauda (R)
Whimbrel, Numenius phaeopus (R)
Eskimo curlew, Numenius borealis (A) (believed extinct)
Long-billed curlew, Numenius americanus (A)
Hudsonian godwit, Limosa haemastica (R)
Marbled godwit, Limosa fedoa (R)
Ruddy turnstone, Arenaria interpres
Black turnstone, Arenaria melanocephala (A)
Red knot, Calidris canutus (R)
Ruff, Calidris pugnax (C)
Sharp-tailed sandpiper, Calidris acuminata (A)
Stilt sandpiper, Calidris himantopus
Curlew sandpiper, Calidris ferruginea (A)
Sanderling, Calidris alba
Dunlin, Calidris alpina
Purple sandpiper, Calidris maritima (C)
Baird's sandpiper, Calidris bairdii
Least sandpiper, Calidris minutilla
White-rumped sandpiper, Calidris fuscicollis
Buff-breasted sandpiper, Calidris subruficollis
Pectoral sandpiper, Calidris melanotos
Semipalmated sandpiper, Calidris pusilla
Western sandpiper, Calidris mauri (R)
Short-billed dowitcher, Limnodromus griseus
Long-billed dowitcher, Limnodromus scolopaceus
American woodcock, Scolopax minor
Wilson's snipe, Gallinago delicata
Spotted sandpiper, Actitis macularius
Solitary sandpiper, Tringa solitaria
Lesser yellowlegs, Tringa flavipes
Willet, Tringa semipalmata
Spotted redshank, Tringa erythropus (H)
Greater yellowlegs, Tringa melanoleuca
Wilson's phalarope, Phalaropus tricolor
Red-necked phalarope, Phalaropus lobatus (R)
Red phalarope, Phalaropus fulicarius (R)

Skuas and jaegers
Order: CharadriiformesFamily: Stercorariidae

Skuas and jaegers are in general medium to large birds, typically with gray or brown plumage, often with white markings on the wings. They have longish bills with hooked tips and webbed feet with sharp claws. They look like large dark gulls, but have a fleshy cere above the upper mandible. They are strong, acrobatic fliers. Three species have been recorded in Wisconsin.

Pomarine jaeger, Stercorarius pomarinus (C)
Parasitic jaeger, Stercorarius parasiticus
Long-tailed jaeger, Stercorarius longicaudus (C)

Auks, murres, and puffins
Order: CharadriiformesFamily: Alcidae

The family Alcidae includes auks, murres, and puffins. These are short-winged birds that live on the open sea and normally only come ashore for breeding. Three confirmed and one hypothetical species have been recorded in Wisconsin.

Dovekie, Alle alle (A)
Thick-billed murre, Uria lomvia (A)
Long-billed murrelet, Brachyramphus perdix (H)
Ancient murrelet, Synthliboarmphus antiquus (A)

Gulls, terns, and skimmers

Order: CharadriiformesFamily: Laridae

Laridae is a family of medium to large seabirds and includes gulls, terns, kittiwakes, and skimmers. They are typically gray or white, often with black markings on the head or wings. They have stout, longish bills and webbed feet. Twenty-nine confirmed and two hypothetical species have been recorded in Wisconsin.

Black-legged kittiwake, Rissa tridactyla (C)
Ivory gull, Pagophila eburnea (A)
Sabine's gull, Xema sabini (R)
Bonaparte's gull, Chroicocephalus philadelphia
Black-headed gull, Chroicocephalus ridibundus (A)
Little gull, Hydrocoleus minutus (R)
Ross's gull, Rhodostethia rosea (A)
Laughing gull, Leucophaeus atricilla (R)
Franklin's gull, Leucophaeus pipixcan
Black-tailed gull, Larus crassirostris (A)
Common gull/short-billed gull, Larus canus/Larus brachyrhynchus (C)
Ring-billed gull, Larus delawarensis
California gull, Larus californicus (C)
Herring gull, Larus argentatus
Iceland gull, Larus glaucoides
Lesser black-backed gull, Larus fuscus
Slaty-backed gull, Larus schistisagus (C)
Glaucous-winged gull, Larus glaucescens (A)
Glaucous gull, Larus hyperboreus
Great black-backed gull, Larus marinus
Sooty tern, Onychoprion fuscata (A)
Least tern, Sternula antillarum (A)
Gull-billed tern, Gelochelidon nilotica (H)
Caspian tern, Hydroprogne caspia
Black tern, Chlidonias niger
White-winged tern, Chlidonias leucopterus (A)
Roseate tern, Sterna dougallii (H)
Common tern, Sterna hirundo
Arctic tern, Sterna paradisaea (C)
Forster's tern, Sterna forsteri
Royal tern, Thalasseus maximus (A)

Loons
Order: GaviiformesFamily: Gaviidae

Loons are aquatic birds the size of a large duck, to which they are unrelated. Their plumage is largely gray or black, and they have spear-shaped bills. Loons swim well and fly adequately, but are almost hopeless on land, because their legs are placed towards the rear of the body. Three species have been recorded in Wisconsin.

Red-throated loon, Gavia stellata
Pacific loon, Gavia pacifica (R)
Common loon, Gavia immer

Storks
Order: CiconiiformesFamily: Ciconiidae

Storks are large, heavy, long-legged, long-necked wading birds with long stout bills and wide wingspans. They lack the powder down that other wading birds such as herons, spoonbills, and ibises use to clean off fish slime. Storks lack a pharynx and are mute. One species has been recorded in Wisconsin.

Wood stork, Mycteria americana (A)

Frigatebirds
Order: SuliformesFamily: Fregatidae

Frigatebirds are large seabirds usually found over tropical oceans. They are large, black, or black-and-white, with long wings and deeply forked tails. The males have colored inflatable throat pouches. They do not swim or walk and cannot take off from a flat surface. Having the largest wingspan-to-body-weight ratio of any bird, they are essentially aerial, able to stay aloft for more than a week. One species has been recorded in Wisconsin.

Magnificent frigatebird, Fregata magnificens (A)

Anhingas
Order: SuliformesFamily: Anhingidae

Anhingas are cormorant-like water birds with very long necks and long, straight beaks. They are fish eaters which often swim with only their neck above the water. One species has been recorded in Wisconsin.

Anhinga, Anhinga anhinga (A)

Cormorants and shags
Order: SuliformesFamily: Phalacrocoracidae

Cormorants are medium-to-large aquatic birds, usually with mainly dark plumage and areas of colored skin on the face. The bill is long, thin, and sharply hooked. Their feet are four-toed and webbed. Two species have been recorded in Wisconsin.

Double-crested cormorant, Nannopterum auritum
Neotropic cormorant, Nannopterum brasilianum (A)

Pelicans

Order: PelecaniformesFamily: Pelecanidae

Pelicans are very large water birds with a distinctive pouch under their beak. Like other birds in the order Pelecaniformes, they have four webbed toes. Two species have been recorded in Wisconsin.

American white pelican, Pelecanus erythrorhynchos
Brown pelican, Pelecanus occidentalis (A)

Herons, egrets, and bitterns

Order: PelecaniformesFamily: Ardeidae

The family Ardeidae contains the herons, egrets, and bitterns. Herons and egrets are medium to large wading birds with long necks and legs. Bitterns tend to be shorter necked and more secretive. Members of Ardeidae fly with their necks retracted, unlike other long-necked birds such as storks, ibises, and spoonbills. Eleven species have been recorded in Wisconsin.

American bittern, Botaurus lentiginosus
Least bittern, Ixobrychus exilis
Great blue heron, Ardea herodias
Great egret, Ardea alba
Snowy egret, Egretta thula (R)
Little blue heron, Egretta caerulea (R)
Tricolored heron, Egretta tricolor (C)
Cattle egret, Bubulcus ibis
Green heron, Butorides virescens
Black-crowned night-heron, Nycticorax nycticorax
Yellow-crowned night-heron, Nyctanassa violacea (R)

Ibises and spoonbills
Order: PelecaniformesFamily: Threskiornithidae

The family Threskiornithidae includes the ibises and spoonbills. They have long, broad wings. Their bodies tend to be elongated, the neck more so, with rather long legs. The bill is also long, decurved in the case of the ibises, straight and distinctively flattened in the spoonbills. Four species have been recorded in Wisconsin.

White ibis, Eudocimus albus (A)
Glossy ibis, Plegadis falcinellus (C)
White-faced ibis, Plegadis chihi (R)
Roseate spoonbill, Platalea ajaja (A)

New World vultures
Order: CathartiformesFamily: Cathartidae

The New World vultures are not closely related to Old World vultures, but superficially resemble them because of convergent evolution. Like the Old World vultures, they are scavengers, however, unlike Old World vultures, which find carcasses by sight, New World vultures have a good sense of smell with which they locate carcasses. Two species have been recorded in Wisconsin.

Black vulture, Coragyps atratus (A)
Turkey vulture, Cathartes aura

Osprey
Order: AccipitriformesFamily: Pandionidae

Pandionidae is a monotypic family of fish-eating birds of prey, possessing a very large, powerful hooked beak for tearing flesh from their prey, strong legs, powerful talons, and keen eyesight.

Osprey, Pandion haliaetus

Hawks, eagles, and kites
Order: AccipitriformesFamily: Accipitridae

Accipitridae is a family of birds of prey, which includes hawks, eagles, kites, harriers, and Old World vultures. These birds have very large powerful hooked beaks for tearing flesh from their prey, strong legs, powerful talons, and keen eyesight. Sixteen species have been recorded in Wisconsin.

White-tailed kite, Elanus leucurus (A)
Swallow-tailed kite, Elanoides forficatus (C) extirpated
Golden eagle, Aquila chrysaetos
Northern harrier, Circus hudsonius
Sharp-shinned hawk, Accipiter striatus
Cooper's hawk, Accipiter cooperii
Northern goshawk, Accipiter gentilis
Bald eagle, Haliaeetus leucocephalus
Mississippi kite, Ictinia mississippiensis (C)
Harris's hawk, Parabuteo unicinctus (A)
Red-shouldered hawk, Buteo lineatus
Broad-winged hawk, Buteo platypterus
Swainson's hawk, Buteo swainsoni (C)
Red-tailed hawk, Buteo jamaicensis
Rough-legged hawk, Buteo lagopus
Ferruginous hawk, Buteo regalis (A)

Barn-owls
Order: StrigiformesFamily: Tytonidae

Barn-owls are medium to large owls with large heads and characteristic heart-shaped faces. They have long strong legs with powerful talons. One species has been recorded in Wisconsin.

Barn owl, Tyto alba (C)

Owls
Order: StrigiformesFamily: Strigidae

Typical owls are small to large solitary nocturnal birds of prey. They have large forward-facing eyes and ears, a hawk-like beak, and a conspicuous circle of feathers around each eye called a facial disk. Eleven species have been recorded in Wisconsin.

Eastern screech-owl, Megascops asio
Great horned owl, Bubo virginianus
Snowy owl, Bubo scandiacus (R)
Northern hawk owl, Surnia ulula (C)
Burrowing owl, Athene cunicularia (A)
Barred owl, Strix varia
Great gray owl, Strix nebulosa (C)
Long-eared owl, Asio otus
Short-eared owl, Asio flammeus
Boreal owl, Aegolius funereus (C)
Northern saw-whet owl, Aegolius acadicus

Kingfishers
Order: CoraciiformesFamily: Alcedinidae

Kingfishers are medium-sized birds with large heads, long, pointed bills, short legs, and stubby tails. One species has been recorded in Wisconsin.

Belted kingfisher, Megaceryle alcyon

Woodpeckers
Order: PiciformesFamily: Picidae

Woodpeckers are small to medium-sized birds with chisel-like beaks, short legs, stiff tails, and long tongues used for capturing insects. Some species have feet with two toes pointing forward and two backward, while several species have only three toes. Many woodpeckers have the habit of tapping noisily on tree trunks with their beaks. Ten species have been recorded in Wisconsin.

Lewis's woodpecker, Melanerpes lewis (A)
Red-headed woodpecker, Melanerpes erythrocephalus
Red-bellied woodpecker, Melanerpes carolinus
Yellow-bellied sapsucker, Sphyrapicus varius
American three-toed woodpecker, Picoides dorsalis (A)
Black-backed woodpecker, Picoides arcticus (R)
Downy woodpecker, Dryobates pubescens
Hairy woodpecker, Dryobates villosus
Northern flicker, Colaptes auratus
Pileated woodpecker, Dryocopus pileatus

Falcons and caracaras
Order: FalconiformesFamily: Falconidae

Falconidae is a family of diurnal birds of prey, notably the falcons and caracaras. They differ from hawks, eagles, and kites in that they kill with their beaks instead of their talons. Six species have been recorded in Wisconsin.

Crested caracara, Caracara plancus (A)
American kestrel, Falco sparverius
Merlin, Falco columbarius
Gyrfalcon, Falco rusticolus (R)
Peregrine falcon, Falco peregrinus
Prairie falcon, Falco mexicanus (A)

New World and African parrots
Order: PsittaciformesFamily: Psittacidae

Parrots are small to large birds with a characteristic curved beak. Their upper mandibles have slight mobility in the joint with the skull and they have a generally erect stance. All parrots are zygodactyl, having the four toes on each foot placed two at the front and two to the back. Most of the more than 150 species in this family are found in the New World. One species has been recorded in Wisconsin.

Carolina parakeet, Conuropsis carolinensis (E)

Tyrant flycatchers
Order: PasseriformesFamily: Tyrannidae

Tyrant flycatchers are Passerine birds which occur throughout North and South America. They superficially resemble the Old World flycatchers, but are more robust and have stronger bills. They do not have the sophisticated vocal capabilities of the songbirds. Most, but not all, are rather plain. As the name implies, most are insectivorous. Twenty and a possible twenty-first confirmed species, and one hypothetical species, have been recorded in Wisconsin.

Ash-throated flycatcher, Myiarchus cinerascens (A)
Great crested flycatcher, Myiarchus crinitus
Tropical kingbird, Tyrannus melancholicus (A)
Tropical kingbird/Couch's kingbird, Tyrannus melancholicus/Tyrannus couchii (A)
Cassin's kingbird, Tyrannus vociferans (H)
Western kingbird, Tyrannus verticalis (R)
Eastern kingbird, Tyrannus tyrannus
Scissor-tailed flycatcher, Tyrannus forficatus (R)
Fork-tailed flycatcher, Tyrannus savana (A)
Olive-sided flycatcher, Contopus cooperi
Western wood-pewee, Contopus sordidulus (A)
Eastern wood-pewee, Contopus virens
Yellow-bellied flycatcher, Empidonax flaviventris
Acadian flycatcher, Empidonax virescens
Alder flycatcher, Empidonax alnorum
Willow flycatcher, Empidonax traillii
Least flycatcher, Empidonax minimus
Hammond's flycatcher, Empidonax hammondii (A)
Dusky flycatcher, Empidonax oberholseri (A)
Eastern phoebe, Sayornis phoebe
Say's phoebe, Sayornis saya (C)
Vermilion flycatcher, Pyrocephalus rubinus (A)

Vireos, shrike-babblers, and erpornis
Order: PasseriformesFamily: Vireonidae

The vireos are a group of small to medium-sized passerine birds. They are typically greenish in color and resemble wood warblers apart from their heavier bills. Nine species have been recorded in Wisconsin.

White-eyed vireo, Vireo griseus
Bell's vireo, Vireo bellii
Gray vireo, Vireo vicinior (A)
Yellow-throated vireo, Vireo flavifrons
Blue-headed vireo, Vireo solitarius
Plumbeous vireo, Vireo plumbeus (H)
Philadelphia vireo, Vireo philadelphicus
Warbling vireo, Vireo gilvus
Red-eyed vireo, Vireo olivaceus

Shrikes
Order: PasseriformesFamily: Laniidae

Shrikes are passerine birds known for their habit of catching other birds and small animals and impaling the uneaten portions of their bodies on thorns. A shrike's beak is hooked, like that of a typical bird of prey. Two species have been recorded in Wisconsin.

Loggerhead shrike, Lanius ludovicianus (R)
Northern shrike, Lanius borealis

Crows, jays, and magpies
Order: PasseriformesFamily: Corvidae

The family Corvidae includes crows, ravens, jays, choughs, magpies, treepies, nutcrackers, and ground jays. Corvids are above average in size among the Passeriformes, and some of the larger species show high levels of intelligence. Six species have been recorded in Wisconsin.

Canada jay, Perisoreus canadensis (R)
Blue jay, Cyanocitta cristata
Clark's nutcracker, Nucifraga columbiana (A)
Black-billed magpie, Pica hudsonia (C)
American crow, Corvus brachyrhynchos
Common raven, Corvus corax

Tits, chickadees, and titmice
Order: PasseriformesFamily: Paridae

The Paridae are mainly small stocky woodland species with short stout bills. Some have crests. They are adaptable birds, with a mixed diet including seeds and insects. Three species have been recorded in Wisconsin.

Black-capped chickadee, Poecile atricapilla
Boreal chickadee, Poecile hudsonica (R)
Tufted titmouse, Baeolophus bicolor

Larks
Order: PasseriformesFamily: Alaudidae

Larks are small terrestrial birds with often extravagant songs and display flights. Most larks are fairly dull in appearance. Their food is insects and seeds. One species has been recorded in Wisconsin.

Horned lark, Eremophila alpestris

Swallows
Order: PasseriformesFamily: Hirundinidae

The family Hirundinidae is a group of passerines characterized by their adaptation to aerial feeding. These adaptations include a slender streamlined body, long pointed wings, and short bills with a wide gape. The feet are adapted to perching rather than walking, and the front toes are partially joined at the base. Seven species have been recorded in Wisconsin.

Bank swallow, Riparia riparia
Tree swallow, Tachycineta bicolor
Northern rough-winged swallow, Stelgidopteryx serripennis
Purple martin, Progne subis
Barn swallow, Hirundo rustica
Cliff swallow, Petrochelidon pyrrhonota
Cave swallow, Petrochelidon fulva (A)

Leaf warblers
Order: PasseriformesFamily: Phylloscopidae

Leaf warblers are a family of small insectivorous birds found mostly in Eurasia and ranging into Wallacea and Africa. The Arctic warbler breeds east into Alaska. The species are of various sizes, often green-plumaged above and yellow below, or more subdued with grayish-green to grayish-brown colors. One species has been recorded in Wisconsin.

Yellow-browed warbler, Phylloscopus inornatus (H)

Kinglets
Order: PasseriformesFamily: Regulidae

The kinglets are a small family of birds which resemble the titmice. They are very small insectivorous birds. The adults have colored crowns, giving rise to their names. Two species have been recorded in Wisconsin.

Ruby-crowned kinglet, Corthylio calendula
Golden-crowned kinglet, Regulus satrapa

Waxwings
Order: PasseriformesFamily: Bombycillidae

The waxwings are a group of birds with soft silky plumage and unique red tips to some of the wing feathers. In the Bohemian and cedar waxwings, these tips look like sealing wax and give the group its name. These are arboreal birds of northern forests. They live on insects in summer and berries in winter. Two species have been recorded in Wisconsin.

Bohemian waxwing, Bombycilla garrulus
Cedar waxwing, Bombycilla cedrorum

Silky-flycatchers
Order: PasseriformesFamily: Ptiliogonatidae

The silky-flycatchers are a small family of passerine birds which occur mainly in Central America, although the range of one species extends to central California. They are related to waxwings and like that group, have soft silky plumage, usually gray or pale yellow in color. They have small crests. One species has been recorded in Wisconsin.

Phainopepla, Phainopepla nitens (A)

Nuthatches
Order: PasseriformesFamily: Sittidae

Nuthatches are small woodland birds. They have the unusual ability to climb down trees head first, unlike other birds which can only go upwards. Nuthatches have big heads, short tails, and powerful bills and feet. Three species have been recorded in Wisconsin.

Red-breasted nuthatch, Sitta canadensis
White-breasted nuthatch, Sitta carolinensis
Brown-headed nuthatch, Sitta pusilla (A)

Treecreepers
Order: PasseriformesFamily: Certhiidae

Treecreepers are small woodland birds, brown above and white below. They have thin pointed down-curved bills, which they use to extricate insects from bark. They have stiff tail feathers, like woodpeckers, which they use to support themselves on vertical trees. One species has been recorded in Wisconsin.

Brown creeper, Certhia americana

Gnatcatchers
Order: PasseriformesFamily: Polioptilidae

These dainty birds resemble Old World warblers in their structure and habits, moving restlessly through the foliage seeking insects. The gnatcatchers are mainly soft bluish gray in color and have the typical insectivore's long sharp bill. Many species have distinctive black head patterns (especially males) and long, regularly cocked, black-and-white tails. One species has been recorded in Wisconsin.

Blue-gray gnatcatcher, Polioptila caerulea

Wrens
Order: PasseriformesFamily: Troglodytidae

Wrens are small and inconspicuous birds, except for their loud songs. They have short wings and thin down-turned bills. Several species often hold their tails upright. All are insectivorous. Seven species have been recorded in Wisconsin.

Rock wren, Salpinctes obsoletus (A)
House wren, Troglodytes aedon
Winter wren, Troglodytes hiemalis
Sedge wren, Cistothorus platensis
Marsh wren, Cistothorus palustris
Carolina wren, Thryothorus ludovicianus
Bewick's wren, Thryomanes bewickii (A)

Mockingbirds and thrashers
Order: PasseriformesFamily: Mimidae

The mimids are a family of passerine birds which includes thrashers, mockingbirds, tremblers, and the New World catbirds. These birds are notable for their vocalization, especially their remarkable ability to mimic a wide variety of birds and other sounds heard outdoors. The species tend towards dull grays and browns in their appearance. Five species have been recorded in Wisconsin.

Gray catbird, Dumetella carolinensis
Curve-billed thrasher, Toxostoma curvirostre (A)
Brown thrasher, Toxostoma rufum
Sage thrasher, Oreoscoptes montanus (A)
Northern mockingbird, Mimus polyglottos (R)

Starlings
Order: PasseriformesFamily: Sturnidae

Starlings are small to medium-sized passerine birds. They are medium-sized passerines with strong feet. Their flight is strong and direct and they are very gregarious. Their preferred habitat is fairly open country, and they eat insects and fruit. Plumage is typically dark with a metallic sheen. One species has been recorded in Wisconsin.

European starling, Sturnus vulgaris (I)

Thrushes and allies
Order: PasseriformesFamily: Turdidae

The thrushes are a group of passerine birds that occur mainly but not exclusively in the Old World. They are plump, soft plumaged, small to medium-sized insectivores or sometimes omnivores, often feeding on the ground. Many have attractive songs. Ten species have been recorded in Wisconsin.

Eastern bluebird, Sialia sialis
Mountain bluebird, Sialia currucoides (C)
Townsend's solitaire, Myadestes townsendi (R)
Veery, Catharus fuscescens
Gray-cheeked thrush, Catharus minimus
Swainson's thrush, Catharus ustulatus
Hermit thrush, Catharus guttatus
Wood thrush, Hylocichla mustelina
American robin, Turdus migratorius
Varied thrush, Ixoreus naevius (R)

Old World flycatchers
Order: PasseriformesFamily: Muscicapidae

The Old World flycatchers are a large family of small passerine birds. These are mainly small arboreal insectivores, many of which, as the name implies, take their prey on the wing. One hypothetical species has been recorded in Wisconsin

Northern wheatear, Oenanthe oenanthe (H)

Old World sparrows

Order: PasseriformesFamily: Passeridae

Old World sparrows are small passerine birds. In general, sparrows tend to be small plump brownish or grayish birds with short tails and short powerful beaks. Sparrows are seed eaters, but they also consume small insects. Two species have been recorded in Wisconsin.

House sparrow, Passer domesticus (I)
Eurasian tree sparrow, Passer montanus (I) (C)

Wagtails and pipits
Order: PasseriformesFamily: Motacillidae

Motacillidae is a family of small passerine birds with medium to long tails. They include the wagtails, longclaws, and pipits. They are slender, ground-feeding insectivores of open country. One confirmed and one hypothetical species have been recorded in Wisconsin.

American pipit, Anthus rubescens
Sprague's pipit, Anthus spragueii (H)

Finches, euphonias, and allies
Order: PasseriformesFamily: Fringillidae

Finches are seed-eating passerine birds, that are small to moderately large and have a strong beak, usually conical and in some species very large. All have twelve tail feathers and nine primaries. These birds have a bouncing flight with alternating bouts of flapping and gliding on closed wings, and most sing well. Twelve confirmed and one hypothetical species have been recorded in Wisconsin.

Brambling, Fringilla montifringilla (A)
Evening grosbeak, Coccothraustes vespertinus
Pine grosbeak, Pinicola enucleator
Gray-crowned rosy-finch, Leucosticte tephrocotis (A)
House finch, Haemorhous mexicanus (native to the southwestern U.S.; introduced in the east)
Purple finch, Haemorhous purpureus
Common redpoll, Acanthis flammea
Hoary redpoll, Acanthis hornemanni (R)
Red crossbill, Loxia curvirostra
White-winged crossbill, Loxia leucoptera
Pine siskin, Spinus pinus
Lesser goldfinch, Spinus psaltria (H)
American goldfinch, Spinus tristis

Longspurs and snow buntings
Order: PasseriformesFamily: Calcariidae

The Calcariidae are a group of passerine birds that were traditionally grouped with the New World sparrows, but differ in a number of respects and are usually found in open grassy areas. Four species have been recorded in Wisconsin.

Lapland longspur, Calcarius lapponicus
Chestnut-collared longspur, Calcarius ornatus (A)
Smith's longspur, Calcarius pictus (C)
Snow bunting, Plectrophenax nivalis

New World sparrows
Order: PasseriformesFamily: Passerellidae

Until 2017, these species were considered part of the family Emberizidae. Most of the species are known as sparrows, but these birds are not closely related to the Old World sparrows which are in the family Passeridae. Many of these have distinctive head patterns. Twenty-seven species have been recorded in Wisconsin.

Grasshopper sparrow, Ammodramus savannarum
Black-throated sparrow, Amphispiza bilineata (A)
Lark sparrow, Chondestes grammacus
Lark bunting, Calamospiza melanocorys (C)
Chipping sparrow, Spizella passerina
Clay-colored sparrow, Spizella pallida
Field sparrow, Spizella pusilla
Fox sparrow, Passerella iliaca
American tree sparrow, Spizelloides arborea
Dark-eyed junco, Junco hyemalis
White-crowned sparrow, Zonotrichia leucophrys
Golden-crowned sparrow, Zonotrichia atricapilla (A)
Harris's sparrow, Zonotrichia querula (R)
White-throated sparrow, Zonotrichia albicollis
Vesper sparrow, Pooecetes gramineus
LeConte's sparrow, Ammospiza leconteii
Nelson's sparrow, Ammospiza nelsoni (R)
Baird's sparrow, Centronyx bairdii (A)
Henslow's sparrow, Centronyx henslowii
Savannah sparrow, Passerculus sandwichensis
Song sparrow, Melospiza melodia
Lincoln's sparrow, Melospiza lincolnii
Swamp sparrow, Melospiza georgiana
Rufous-crowned sparrow, Aimophila ruficeps (A)
Green-tailed towhee, Pipilo chlorurus (A)
Spotted towhee, Pipilo maculatus (C)
Eastern towhee, Pipilo erythrophthalmus

Yellow-breasted chat
Order: PasseriformesFamily: Icteriidae

This species was historically placed in the wood-warblers (Parulidae) but nonetheless most authorities were unsure if it belonged there. It was placed in its own family in 2017.

Yellow-breasted chat, Icteria virens

Troupials and allies
Order: PasseriformesFamily: Icteridae

The icterids are a group of small to medium-sized, often colorful passerine birds restricted to the New World and include the grackles, New World blackbirds, and New World orioles. Most species have black as a predominant plumage color, often enlivened by yellow, orange, or red. Sixteen species have been recorded in Wisconsin.

Yellow-headed blackbird, Xanthocephalus xanthocephalus
Bobolink, Dolichonyx oryzivorus
Eastern meadowlark, Sturnella magna
Western meadowlark, Sturnella neglecta
Orchard oriole, Icterus spurius
Hooded oriole, Icterus cucullatus (A)
Streak-backed oriole, Icterus pustulatus (A)
Bullock's oriole, Icterus bullockii (A)
Baltimore oriole, Icterus galbula
Scott's oriole, Icterus parisorum (A)
Red-winged blackbird, Agelaius phoeniceus
Brown-headed cowbird, Molothrus ater
Rusty blackbird, Euphagus carolinus
Brewer's blackbird, Euphagus cyanocephalus
Common grackle, Quiscalus quiscula
Great-tailed grackle, Quiscalus mexicanus  (A)

New World warblers
Order: PasseriformesFamily: Parulidae

The wood-warblers are a group of small and often colorful passerine birds restricted to the New World. Most are arboreal, but some like the ovenbird and the two waterthrushes, are more terrestrial. Most members of this family are insectivores. Forty-two confirmed and one hypothetical species have been recorded in Wisconsin.

Ovenbird, Seiurus aurocapilla
Worm-eating warbler, Helmitheros vermivorum (R)
Louisiana waterthrush, Parkesia motacilla
Northern waterthrush, Parkesia noveboracensis
Golden-winged warbler, Vermivora chrysoptera
Blue-winged warbler, Vermivora cyanoptera
Black-and-white warbler, Mniotilta varia
Prothonotary warbler, Protonotaria citrea
Swainson's warbler, Limnothlypis swainsonii (A)
Tennessee warbler, Leiothlypis peregrina
Orange-crowned warbler, Leiothlypis celata
Nashville warbler, Leiothlypis ruficapilla
Virginia's warbler, Leiothlypis virginiae (H)
Connecticut warbler, Oporornis agilis
MacGillivray's warbler, Geothlypis tolmiei (A)
Mourning warbler, Geothlypis philadelphia
Kentucky warbler, Geothlypis formosa (R)
Common yellowthroat, Geothlypis trichas
Hooded warbler, Setophaga citrina
American redstart, Setophaga ruticilla
Kirtland's warbler, Setophaga kirtlandii (R)
Cape May warbler, Setophaga tigrina
Cerulean warbler, Setophaga cerulea
Northern parula, Setophaga americana
Magnolia warbler, Setophaga magnolia
Bay-breasted warbler, Setophaga castanea
Blackburnian warbler, Setophaga fusca
Yellow warbler, Setophaga petechia
Chestnut-sided warbler, Setophaga pensylvanica
Blackpoll warbler, Setophaga striata
Black-throated blue warbler, Setophaga caerulescens
Palm warbler, Setophaga palmarum
Pine warbler, Setophaga pinus
Yellow-rumped warbler, Setophaga coronata
Yellow-throated warbler, Setophaga dominica (R)
Prairie warbler, Setophaga discolor (R)
Black-throated gray warbler, Setophaga nigrescens (A)
Townsend's warbler, Setophaga townsendi (A)
Hermit warbler, Setophaga occidentalis (A)
Black-throated green warbler, Setophaga virens
Canada warbler, Cardellina canadensis
Wilson's warbler, Cardellina pusilla
Painted redstart, Myioborus pictus (A)

Cardinals and allies
Order: PasseriformesFamily: Cardinalidae

The cardinals are a family of robust, seed-eating birds with strong bills. They are typically associated with open woodland. The sexes usually have distinct plumages. Twelve species have been recorded in Wisconsin.

Summer tanager, Piranga rubra (R)
Scarlet tanager, Piranga olivacea
Western tanager, Piranga ludoviciana (R)
Northern cardinal, Cardinalis cardinalis
Pyrrhuloxia, Cardinalis sinuatus  (A)
Rose-breasted grosbeak, Pheucticus ludovicianus
Black-headed grosbeak, Pheucticus melanocephalus (C)
Blue grosbeak, Passerina caerulea (R)
Lazuli bunting, Passerina amoena (A)
Indigo bunting, Passerina cyanea
Painted bunting, Passerina ciris (C)
Dickcissel, Spiza americana

See also
List of birds
Lists of birds by region
List of North American birds

Notes

References

External links
Wisconsin Society for Ornithology
Beautiful Birds Found in Wisconsin

Wisconsin
Birds